Yoselin Roxana Aquino Alba (born 28 December 1991) is a Bolivian footballer who plays as a goalkeeper for the Bolivia women's national team.

Early life
Aquino hails from the Santa Cruz Department.

International career
Aquino played for Bolivia at senior level in the 2018 Copa América Femenina.

References

1991 births
Living people
Women's association football goalkeepers
Bolivian women's footballers
People from Santa Cruz Department (Bolivia)
Bolivia women's international footballers